Rudolf Sieckenius (16 May 1896 – 28 April 1945) was a German Generalmajor during World War II who commanded the 16 Panzer Division during Operation Avalanche (Salerno Landings) in September 1943. Despite his widely acknowledged success, which almost resulted in the Allies being pushed back into the sea, Sieckenius was made a scapegoat and sidelined until his death during the Battle of Berlin, when he commanded a security division (391 Sicherungs Division).

World War I and inter-war period
Sieckenius was born in Ludwigsthal, Silesia in 1896. Sieckenius joined up immediately following the outbreak of World War I, enlisting in the 5th Foot Artillery Regiment of the 9th Silesian Infantry Division, during which time he took part in the Invasion of Lorraine. He was commissioned as a platoon commander in the 154th Infantry Regiment in 1916. He was discharged from the Army on 20 October 1919 and returned to his family home in Silesia.

On 29 April 1920, Sieckenius joined the local Silesian police where he served for fourteen years. In 1934 he transferred back to the army, as Hitler rearmed Germany. On creation of the Panzer regiments in late 1935, he transferred into the Panzer branch and was appointed a company commander in 2nd Panzer Regiment (which he was later to command at Stalingrad) based in Weimar, where he spent a year.  After a further year as ADC/Orderly Officer to the commander of 1st Panzer Division, Generalmajor Maximilian von Weichs, he was appointed to command the first battalion of 15th Panzer Regiment at Oppeln.  After a falling out with the regimental commander, Oberstleutnant Streich, in January 1939 Sieckenius was transferred to command of the 66th Panzer Battalion (2nd Light Division).

World War II

At the outset of the war Sieckenius served in the 2nd Light Division as commander of a Panzer battalion. Following the campaign in October 1939, the 2nd Light Division became the 7th Panzer Division. The new division was under the command of General Erwin Rommel. Sieckenius remained in command of a Panzer battalion, and took part in the Battle of France. The battalion remained in France until February 1941, when it was placed in reserve and returned to Germany. Here Sieckenius remained, refitting his battalion until he was transferred to the newly formed 16th Panzer Division in April, with which he took part in Operation Barbarossa, the invasion of the Soviet Union in June 1941, during which Sieckenius was awarded the Knight’s Cross.

Sieckenius was in command of 16th Panzer Division in Italy from May to November 1943, defending capably against the Allied landings at Salerno, and managing the subsequent withdrawal to the Viktor Line on the Volturno River north of Naples. At the beginning of October 1943 16th Panzer was already moving to the Adriatic coast sector as a result of Allied pressure when an amphibious landing was made at Termoli. Sieckenius' performance in that battle was the reason for his sacking as commander of 16th Panzer, as it was considered he had not been sufficiently aggressive in repelling the landing, and an opportunity to hand a defeat to the Allies had been lost, along with an important defensive position.

Generalmajor Sieckenius was eventually killed in action near Märkisch Buchholz during the Battle of Halbe.

Awards
Wound Badge in Silver
Knight's Cross of the Iron Cross on 17 September 1941 as Oberstleutnant and commander of Panzer-Regiment 2

References

Citations

Bibliography

 
 

1896 births
1945 deaths
People from Zielona Góra County
Major generals of the German Army (Wehrmacht)
German Army personnel of World War I
People from the Province of Silesia
Recipients of the Knight's Cross of the Iron Cross
German Army personnel killed in World War II